Leonardo Enrique Montenegro Corona (born 16 February 1955 in Santiago, Chile) is a Chilean former professional footballer who played as a midfielder for clubs of Chile and South Africa.

Clubs
 Universidad de Chile 1973–1976
 O'Higgins 1977
 Ñublense 1978
 Universidad de Chile 1979–1980
 Palestino 1981–1984
 Moroka Swallows 1985
 Palestino 1986
 Colo-Colo 1987–1990

Honours
 Universidad de Chile 1979 (Copa Chile)
 Colo-Colo 1988, 1989 and 1990 (Copa Chile), 1989 (Chilean Primera División Championship)

References

External links
 
 Leonardo Montenegro at playmakerstats.com

1955 births
Living people
Footballers from Santiago
Chilean footballers
Chilean expatriate footballers
Association football midfielders
Universidad de Chile footballers
O'Higgins F.C. footballers
Ñublense footballers
Club Deportivo Palestino footballers
Moroka Swallows F.C. players
Colo-Colo footballers
Chilean Primera División players
Chilean expatriate sportspeople in South Africa
Expatriate soccer players in South Africa